Green Hill Jones (December 24, 1842 - November 12, 1924) was a state legislator and Baptist minister in Arkansas. He served in the Arkansas House of Representatives for Chicot County in 1885 and 1889, and he was a Republican.

Jones was born in Tennessee and was enslaved on Kenneth Rayner's plantation in Chicot County, Arkansas. During the American Civil War he served in a "Colored" unit in the Union Army. He studied at Hillsdale College in Michigan from 1870 until 1873.

He also served as Chicot County treasurer from 1874 to 1876.

He died November 12, 1924 and is buried at Mason (African American) Cemetery in Chicot County.

See also
African-American officeholders during and following the Reconstruction era

References

External links 
 The book  contains a photograph of him.

1842 births
1924 deaths
19th-century American politicians
Republican Party members of the Arkansas House of Representatives
Baptist ministers from the United States
African-American state legislators in Arkansas
County treasurers in the United States
County officials in Arkansas
Hillsdale College alumni
People from Chicot County, Arkansas
20th-century African-American people